Oldřich Kolář (born 21 January 1898, date of death unknown) was a Czech cross-country skier. He competed in the men's 50 kilometre event at the 1924 Winter Olympics.

References

External links
 

1898 births
Year of death missing
People from Trutnov District
People from the Kingdom of Bohemia
Czech male cross-country skiers
Olympic cross-country skiers of Czechoslovakia
Cross-country skiers at the 1924 Winter Olympics
Sportspeople from the Hradec Králové Region